Endotricha peterella is a species of snout moth in the genus Endotricha. It was described by Paul E. S. Whalley in 1963, and is known from Caroline Island.

References

Endotrichini
Moths described in 1963